Haralamb or Haralambie is a Romanian-language male name (variant of Charalambos) that may refer to:

Haralamb H. Georgescu
Haralamb Lecca
Haralamb Zincă
Haralambie Corbu
Haralambie Dumitraș
Haralambie Eftimie
Haralambie Ivanov
Nicolae Haralambie
Romice Haralambie

Romanian masculine given names
Romanian-language surnames